The United States House of Representatives elections in California, 1932 was an election for California's delegation to the United States House of Representatives, which occurred as part of the general election of the House of Representatives on November 8, 1932. This election began the transition of California from a solidly Republican state to a swing state, which it would be for the next 60 years. California gained nine seats as a result of the 1930 Census; it would have been six if the House seats were reapportioned in 1920 since California would have had 14 seats as a result of the 1920 Census. Democrats won six of those seats while Republicans won three. Of California's existing seats, Democrats won four Republican-held seats.

Overview

Delegation composition

Results
Final results from the Clerk of the House of Representatives:

District 1

District 2

District 3

District 4

District 5

District 6

District 7

District 8

District 9

District 10

District 11

District 12

District 13

District 14

District 15

District 16

District 17

District 18

District 19

District 20

See also
73rd United States Congress
Political party strength in California
Political party strength in U.S. states
1932 United States House of Representatives elections

References
California Elections Page
Office of the Clerk of the House of Representatives

External links
California Legislative District Maps (1911-Present)
RAND California Election Returns: District Definitions

1932 California elections
1932
California United States House of Representatives